Listed below are the UCI Women's Teams that competed in 2014 women's road cycling events organized by the International Cycling Union (UCI), including the 2014 UCI Women's Road World Cup.

Teams overview

The country designation of each team is determined by the country of registration of the largest number of its riders, and is not necessarily the country where the team is registered or based.

The 2014 UCI Women's Teams were:

List updated 30 April 2014.

Riders

This is a list of riders riding for the UCI Women's Teams in 2014 sorted by team. For the differences with the 2013 season, see list of women's road cycling transfers 2014.

Alé–Cipollini

Ages as of 1 January 2014.

Astana BePink Womens Team

Ages as of 1 January 2014 As of April 2014.

Bigla Cycling Team

As of 1 January 2014. Ages as of 1 January 2014.

Bizkaia–Durango

Ages as of 1 January 2014.

China Chongming–Giant–Champion System Pro Cycling
Ages as of 1 January 2014.

Boels–Dolmans Cycling Team

As of 1 March 2014. Ages as of 1 January 2014.

BTC City Ljubljana

Ages as of 1 January 2014.

Estado de México–Faren Kuota

Ages as of 1 January 2014.

Forno d'Asolo–Astute

Ages as of 1 January 2014.

Futurumshop.nl–Zannata

Ages as of 1 January 2014.

Hitec Products
Roster in 2014, ages as of 1 January 2014:

Lointek

Ages as of 1 January 2014.

Lotto–Belisol Ladies

Ages as of 1 January 2014.

No Radunion Vitalogic
Roster in 2014, ages as of 1 January 2014:

Optum p/b Kelly Benefit Strategies
Ages as of 1 January 2014.

Orica–AIS

Ages as of 1 January 2014.

*On June 17, the team announced the signing of Katrin Garfoot for the remainder of the 2014 season.

Parkhotel Valkenburg Continental Team

As of 1 January 2014. Ages as of 1 January 2014.

Rabo–Liv Women Cycling Team

Ages as of 1 January 2014

RusVelo

Ages as of 1 January 2014.

S.C. Michela Fanini Rox

Servetto Footon

Ages as of 1 January 2014.

Specialized–lululemon

As of 1 January 2014. Ages as of 1 January 2014.

Team Giant–Shimano

As of 1 January 2014. Ages as of 1 January 2014.

Team Rytger
Roster in 2014, ages as of 1 January 2014:

TIBCO / To The Top
Ages as of 1 January 2014.

Top Girls Fassa Bortolo

Topsport Vlaanderen–Pro-Duo

Ages as of 1 January 2014.

UnitedHealthcare Women's Team

Vaiano Fondriest

Ages as of 1 January 2014.

Poitou–Charentes.Futuroscope.86

Ages as of 1 January 2014.

Wiggle–Honda

Ages as of 1 January 2014 

Australian criteriums
A few other riders rode at the end of 2014 in name of the team criteriums in Australia.

References

2014
2014 UCI Women's Road World Cup